The Nesbitts Are Coming is a British comedy television series which first aired on ITV in 1980.

Main cast
 Clive Swift as  Ernie Nesbitt
 Maggie Jones as Mrs. Nesbitt
 Deirdre Costello as Marlene Nesbitt
 John Price as Len Nesbitt
 Christian Rodska as Tom Nesbitt
 Ken Jones as  Detective Sergeant Arnold Nixon
 Tony Melody as Station Sergeant Billy Machin
 John Clive as  PC Emlyn Harris
 Patsy Rowlands as WPC Kitty Naylor
 Arthur White as  PC Crowther

References

Bibliography
 Howard Maxford. Hammer Complete: The Films, the Personnel, the Company. McFarland, 2018.

External links
 

ITV sitcoms
1980 British television series debuts
1980 British television series endings
1980s British comedy television series
Television series by ITV Studios
Television series by Yorkshire Television
English-language television shows